Armin Ćerimagić (born 14 January 1994) is a Bosnian professional footballer who plays as a left winger.

References

External links

Armin Ćerimagić at Sofascore

1994 births
Living people
Footballers from Sarajevo
Association football wingers
Bosnia and Herzegovina footballers
Bosnia and Herzegovina youth international footballers
Bosnia and Herzegovina under-21 international footballers
K.A.A. Gent players
S.C. Eendracht Aalst players
Górnik Zabrze players
GKS Katowice players
NK Mura players
NK Triglav Kranj players
FK Mladost Doboj Kakanj players
FK Željezničar Sarajevo players
Belgian Pro League players
Challenger Pro League players
Ekstraklasa players
Slovenian PrvaLiga players
Slovenian Second League players
Premier League of Bosnia and Herzegovina players
Bosnia and Herzegovina expatriate footballers
Expatriate footballers in Belgium
Bosnia and Herzegovina expatriate sportspeople in Belgium
Expatriate footballers in Poland
Bosnia and Herzegovina expatriate sportspeople in Poland
Expatriate footballers in Slovenia
Bosnia and Herzegovina expatriate sportspeople in Slovenia